Josef Illig (1908-1970) was a German cinematographer.

Selected filmography
 People Who Travel (1938)
 Water for Canitoga (1939)
 The Eternal Spring (1940)
 Keepers of the Night (1949)
 The Trip to Marrakesh (1949)
 Chased by the Devil (1950)
 Love on Ice (1950)
 Kissing Is No Sin (1950)
 King for One Night (1950)
 Two in One Suit (1950)
 The Cloister of Martins (1951)
 My Name is Niki (1952)
 The Exchange (1952)
 The Crucifix Carver of Ammergau (1952)
 House of Life (1952)
 Scandal at the Girls' School (1953)

References

Bibliography 
 Fritsche, Maria. Homemade Men In Postwar Austrian Cinema: Nationhood, Genre and Masculinity . Berghahn Books, 2013.

External links 
 

Film people from Munich
1908 births
1970 deaths
German cinematographers